"Sixteen" is a song by English singer Ellie Goulding, released as a single through Polydor Records on 12 April 2019 as a bonus track from the international digital edition of her fourth studio album Brightest Blue. It was co-written by Goulding with Raye and Fred, and produced by Ian Kirkpatrick, Fred and Mike Wise. Goulding has said the song is about the "reckless days of adolescence".

Composition
"Sixteen" is a pop, EDM and dance-pop ballad with an electronic beat that speaks about the "reckless days of adolescence". It is written in the key of A-flat major with a tempo of 110 beats per minute.

Promotion
Goulding announced the song on social media on 11 April 2019, also posting that she compiled the cover artwork from friends' photos of when they were sixteen years of age.

Music video 
The music video directed by Tim Mattia was released on April 17, 2019, reflecting on Goulding's teenage years.

Track listing

Charts

Certifications

Release history

References

2019 singles
2019 songs
Ellie Goulding songs
Songs written by Ellie Goulding
Songs written by Fred Again
Songs written by Raye (singer)
Songs written by Joe Kearns